On August 9, 1820, William Woodbridge, the first delegate for , resigned, after having served since March 2, 1820. A special election was held to fill the resulting vacancy.

Election results

Sibley took his seat on November 20, 1820.

See also
 List of special elections to the United States House of Representatives
 1820 and 1821 United States House of Representatives elections

References

Michigan territory 1820
1820-08
Michigan territory 1820
United States House of Representatives
Michigan at-large special
United States House of Representatives 1820 at-large